Youssouf Hadji (born 25 February 1980) is a Moroccan former professional footballer who played as an attacking midfielder. He notably had three spells for French side AS Nancy, also serving as the team captain, making 378 appearances and scoring 95 goals for the club. At international level, he represented the Morocco national team earning 64 caps and scoring 16 goals. He also holds a French passport.

He is the younger brother of former Moroccan star Mustapha Hadji and the uncle of striker Samir Hadji. In May 2016, he won the 2015–16 Ligue 2 with AS Nancy.

Career

Nancy
Hadji started his career at AS Nancy in Ligue 1 under the guidance of László Bölöni. Nancy were relegated to Ligue 2 in 2000, but Hadji remained loyal and played on for another three seasons.

Bastia and Rennes
In 2003, Hadji moved to Corsica to play for SC Bastia in Ligue 1. After his old team were relegated at the end of his second season there, he reunited with Bölöni at Rennes. In Brittany, he was not a regular starter but contributed largely to their season with 3 goals and 3 assists.

Return to Nancy
On 10 January 2007, Hadji re-joined AS Nancy from Rennes for an estimated £1.2m.

Rennes
On 31 August 2011, after four years at Nancy, Hadji returned to Rennes, for one season with the Ligue 1 team.

Qatar
Hadji signed a two-year contract with Qatari side Al-Arabi on 26 June 2012. Sidelined due of injuries for most of the season, he terminated his contract after only one season making only 8 appearances in all competitions.

Turkey
Hadji signed a two-year-deal with Elazığspor but he terminated his contract in February after financial problems in the club which prevented him from receiving his wages. He returned to train with his hometown club Nancy to keep fit.

Third stint with Nancy

2014–15 Ligue 2
In May 2014, Hadji came back to Nancy, making it the third stint with his debut team. He stated that he wanted to help his team promote to Ligue 1 again and to retire at his hometown club. He was named as the captain of the team in the match against Stade Brest and since then he remained captain. He scored his first goal in a 2–2 draw against US Orléans on 21 December 2014. His second goal was the equalizer in a 1–1 draw against Nîmes Olympique. He scored both goals in a 2–1 home win against Stade Brest, the club's first win since November 2014. Hadji scored another goal in a 2–0 away win against Sochaux followed by a brace in a 6–0 win against LB Châteauroux although playing for only 60 minutes in the game before being substituted. AS Nancy achieved three consecutive wins and gained 11 points out of a possible 15 from their last five matches, thereby moving up five positions to become 6th in Ligue 2.

2015–16 Ligue 2 
On 3 August 2015, Hadji started the second season of his third spell at AS Nancy with a 0–0 draw against Tours FC. He assisted a goal in a 3–0 home win against Stade Brest. He scored his first goal in his sixth appearance in the league in a 1–1 draw in Stade Marcel Picot against Chamois Niortais. Again he recorded a second assist on 2 October in a 3–0 win against AC Ajaccio. He returned to scoring against Dijon FCO in a home win, and again in an away win against Evian Thonon Gaillard in the Parc des Sports, Annecy helping Nancy jump to the top of the Ligue 2 table. He scored a brace against Nîmes Olympique in January 2016. On 25 April 2016, Nancy were crowned as the champions of the 2015–16 Ligue 2 after a 1–0 home win against Sochaux. After the coronation, Hadji scored a brace in a 2–0 win against Tours FC, but before recorded another assist against Evian Thonon Gaillard which was relegated to 2016–17 Championnat National thanks to this goal. Hadji finished the season with 9 goals and 3 assists in 33 appearances.

2016–17 Ligue 1
Since the team was promoted back to Ligue 1 since their last stint on 2012–13 Season, Hadji was appointed as the team captain for the 2016–17 Ligue 1 season. He appeared in 26 matches mostly as a substitute, but failed to score during the league season. On 10 September 2016, he recorded one assist against FC Lorient in the 31st minute. He scored only one goal against Besançon FC on the 58th minute in a 3–0 win during a 2016–17 Coupe de la Ligue match. By the end of the season, Nancy achieved the 19th position on the league table and was relegated again to Ligue 2.

2017–18 Ligue 2 and last season
On 25 July, Hadji extended his contract for another season even though it was believed he was going to retire by the end of the 2016–17 Ligue 1 season. He scored 4 goals in 5 matches against FC Sochaux-Montbéliard, Stade Brestois 29, Valenciennes FC and Football Bourg-en-Bresse Péronnas 01 respectively. On 29 September, he scored a hat-trick against LB Châteauroux in a 4–1 win. He scored a brace against Tours FC three months later. and then he did not score until the last 2 games of the season, the first in a 2–1 away loss against Paris FC and the second and the last in his career in a 3–0 home win against US Orléans from the penalty spot. He received a standing ovation from AS Nancy fans.

Personal life
Youssouf's older brother Mustapha was a Moroccan international footballer, having had a successful career in football, before ending his career in 2010. Mustapha previously played for well-known clubs such as Coventry City, Sporting and Deportivo La Coruña. He is married to hair stylist Behcia Hadji, they have 2 daughters together.

Career statistics

Club

International
Scores and results list Morocco's goal tally first, score column indicates score after each Hadji goal.

Honours
Nancy
Ligue 2: 2015–16

Individual
Ligue 2 top scorer: 2014–15 with 13 goals

References

External links
Youssouf Hadji's profile, stats & pics

1980 births
Living people
People from Ifrane Atlas-Saghir
Shilha people
French people of Shilha descent
Moroccan footballers
Association football forwards
Association football midfielders
Morocco international footballers
2004 African Cup of Nations players
2006 Africa Cup of Nations players
2008 Africa Cup of Nations players
2012 Africa Cup of Nations players
Ligue 1 players
Ligue 2 players
Qatar Stars League players
Süper Lig players
AS Nancy Lorraine players
SC Bastia players
Stade Rennais F.C. players
Al-Arabi SC (Qatar) players
Elazığspor footballers
Moroccan expatriate footballers
Moroccan expatriate sportspeople in Qatar
Expatriate footballers in Qatar